Charles Laurence (10 January 1931 – 13 July 2013) was a British actor and playwright who worked in films and television.

Early life
Charles Laurence was born Carlos Felipes in Tangiers when it was an International zone, to a Swiss-Scottish mother and a Gibraltarian father of Spanish-Italian descent. Until the age of seven, he spoke only French and Spanish. He learned English as well when the family moved to England. As a young boy he went to Taunton School in Somerset and then to RADA.

Career
In the early 1950s, after a spell at Guildford Repertoire (1953), he appeared in numerous stage plays and comedies in repertoire at the Oxford Playhouse and the Bristol Old Vic. In the West End he appeared in Ross at the Haymarket Theatre. In the 1950s and 1960s he appeared in films and on television. He worked as a playwright from 1969 to 1999. He died on 13 July 2013 in St Johns Wood, London.

Work as an actor
Cross Channel (1955) - Jean-Pierre Moreau
A Hill in Korea (1956) - Pvt. Kim
ITV Play of the Week: (The Last Hours (1959) and The School for Wives (1958)) - Hendrik / Horace, Oronte's son
Hotel Imperial (1960) - Jose da Irala
Dixon of Dock Green (1962) - Cable
Sierra Nine (1963) - Brother Jullen
The Third Man (1964) - The Bell Boy
A High Wind in Jamaica (1965) - Tallyman
199 Park Lane (1965) - Nicky
Vendetta (1966) - Ray
The Magnificent Two (1967) - Sharpshooter
Man in a Suitcase (1967–1968) - Van Driver / Martin (final film role)

Work as a playwright
What’s a Mother For? (Jan 1969) Armchair Theatre, ITV (starring June Whitfield and Joe Brown)
The Swan Won’t go in the Fridge (Oct 1969) Armchair Theatre, ITV (starring Rosemary Leach and Peter Cellier]
Now, Take My Wife (1971), a TV series of 6 episodes for the BBC (starring Sheila Hancock, Donald Houston, and Liz Edmiston)
Just Harry and Me (1971) for Comedy Playhouse, BBC
My Fat Friend (1972), a stage comedy (with Kenneth Williams and Jennie Linden)
Snap! (1974), a stage comedy (Maggie Smith starred in this; Vaudeville Theatre London)
Poor Little Rich Girls (1984), a TV series of 8 episodes starring Maria Aitken, Jill Bennett and Joan Hickson
About Alice (1998), a stage comedy
The Ring Sisters (1999), a stage comedy

References

External links
 Ftvdb.bfi.org.uk
 Doollee.com
 
 

1931 births
2013 deaths
20th-century British dramatists and playwrights
20th-century British male writers
British male dramatists and playwrights
British people of Gibraltarian descent
English people of Italian descent
English people of Scottish descent
English people of Spanish descent
English people of Swiss descent
People from Tangier